Poecilostreptus is a genus of birds in the tanager family Thraupidae.

Taxonomy and species list
These species were formerly placed in the genus Tangara. A molecular phylogenetic study published in 2014 found that Tangara was polyphyletic. In the rearrangement to create monophyletic genera, the new genus, Poecilostreptus, was erected with the grey-and-gold tanager as the type species. The genus name combines the Ancient Greek ποικίλος/poikílo meaning "spotted" or "dappled" and στρεπτός/streptós meaning "collar".

The genus contains the two species:

 Azure-rumped tanager, Poecilostreptus cabanisi
 Grey-and-gold tanager, Poecilostreptus palmeri

References

Poecilostreptus
Bird genera
Taxa named by Kevin J. Burns (ornithologist)
Taxa named by Philip Unitt
Taxa named by Nicholas A. Mason